Great Stambridge is a village and former civil parish,  south east of Chelmsford, now in the parish of Stambridge, in the Rochford district, in the county of Essex, England. In 1931 the parish had a population of 355.

Features 
Great Stambridge has a church called St Mary & All Saints and a pub called The Royal Oak.

History 
The name "Stambridge" means 'Stone bridge'. Great Stambridge was recorded in the Domesday Book as Sanforda. Great Stambridge had 3 manors, Great Stambridge Hall, Hampton-Barns and Bretton. Great Stambridge was in the Rochford hundred. On 1 April 1934 the parish was abolished and merged with Little Stambridge to form Stambridge parish.

References

External links
 
 

Villages in Essex
Former civil parishes in Essex
Rochford District